Dmitry Mikhaylovich Karbyshev (Omsk — 18 February 1945, Mauthausen, Austria) was an officer of the Russian Imperial Army, a Red Army general, professor of the Soviet General Staff Academy (Doctor of Military Sciences), and Hero of the Soviet Union (posthumously).

Biography

Early years
Karbyshev was born in Omsk to the well-known Siberian Cossack starshyna family of Kryashen origin and spoke both Russian and the Kryashen dialect of Tatar. His father died when he was twelve, and he was raised by his mother. Despite financial difficulties, he graduated from the Siberian Cadet Corps (today Omsk Cadet Corps of Ministry of Defense) in 1898 and went on to attend the Saint-Petersburg Nikolaev Military Engineering College (Uchilishche), from which he graduated in 1900. He was assigned to serve in the 1st East Siberian Sapper Battalion, in charge of battlefield telegraph operations (chief of cable section of a telegraph company), and was stationed in Manchuria.

Russo-Japanese War and World War I
During the Russo-Japanese War (1904 to 1905), Karbyshev was responsible in building bridges,  and conducting reconnaissance patrols, as well as telegraph operations. He was at the Battle of Mukden and was decorated for bravery. He was promoted to Lieutenant (poruchik) at the end of the war.

Karbyshev subsequently served in Vladivostok. He returned to St. Petersburg to graduate from the Nikolaev Military Engineering Academy in 1911 (present-day Saint Petersburg Military Engineering-Technical University). Promoted to Staff Captain, he was then sent to Brest-Litovsk as commander of a sapper company, and participated in the construction of fortifications for the Brest Fortress.

At the start of World War I, Karbyshev was involved in combat operations in the Carpathians under General Aleksei Brusilov’s 8th Army on the Southwestern Front. At first he was the divisions' engineer for the 78th and the 69th Infantry Divisions, later chief of engineer service for the 22nd Finland Riflemen Corps. In early 1915, he was at the Siege of Przemyśl, where he was wounded in the leg. He was decorated with the Order of St. Anne for bravery and promoted to lieutenant colonel. In 1916, he participated in the Brusilov Offensive. With the February Revolution and the collapse of the Russian Empire, Karbyshev joined the local Red Guard in December 1917 while stationed at Mogilev-Podolsky (today Ukraine). From 1918, he was an officer in the Bolshevik Red Army.

Civil War
During the Russian Civil War, Karbyshev oversaw the construction of numerous fortifications, particularly the Kakhovka Platzdarm, and held senior positions at the headquarters of the North Caucasus Military District. In 1920, he was chief engineer of the Soviet 5th Army and the assistant of chief engineer of the Southern Front (second formation). Karbyshev supervised engineering support for the assaults on Chongar fortifications and Perekop against the White movement in the Crimea.

Interbellum period in academy
From 1923 to 1926, Karbyshev was the Chairman of the Engineering Committee of the Main Military Engineering Administration of the Red Army. In 1926, he became an instructor at the M. V. Frunze Military Academy, and in 1936, he joined the General Staff Academy. In 1929, Karbyshev was appointed to design Stalin line and Molotov line. In February 1934, he was appointed the Head of Department of Military-Engineering Science of General Staff Academy. Since 1936, Karbyshev was an assistant to the Head of Department of Large Formations' Tactics of the Academy. He was promoted to Professor in 1938, and to the military rank of lieutenant general in the Corps of Engineers in 1940. In 1941, Karbyshev was awarded doctorate in military sciences. He published over 100 research papers in military engineering and military history. He specialized in the construction and demolition of obstacles, and in the issues involved in crossing rivers and other water obstacles. His articles and manuals on the theory of engineering and battlefield operations and tactics were mandatory for reading by Red Army commanders in the pre-war years. He also served as a consultant for the restoration of the Trinity Lavra of St. Sergius outside of Moscow.

World War II
During the Winter War of 1939–40 between the Soviet Union and Finland, as a member of the group to the assistant of chief of the Main Military-Engineering Administration in fortification construction Karbyshev travelled to the front lines to advise troops on engineering support in breaching the Mannerheim Line.

In early June 1941, Karbyshev was sent on the inspection trip to Western Special Military District. The German invasion occurred while he was at the headquarters of Soviet 3rd Army in Grodno. Two days later, he moved to the headquarters of the Soviet 10th Army. On June 27, 1941, the army became surrounded and eventually destroyed during the Battle of Białystok–Minsk. In August 1941, Karbyshev suffered from post-concussion syndrome in combat at the Dnieper River in what is now the Shklow Raion, Mogilev Region, and while unconscious was captured by the Nazis.

Karbyshev was held at a succession of concentration camps, including Hammelburg, Flossenbürg, Majdanek, Auschwitz, Sachsenhausen and, in February 1945, Mauthausen. Refusing repeated offers from the Nazis to solicit his cooperation, and despite his advanced age, he was one of the most active leaders of the camp resistance movement.

On the night of 17 February 1945, he was one of 500 prisoners undressed, doused with cold water and left to expire in the frost. According to the literary testimony of a camp survivor, Karbyshev stayed upright facing his executioners and shouted encouragements to his fellow prisoners.

After the end of the war, on 16 August 1946, he was posthumously awarded the Hero of the Soviet Union medal. A white-marble monument of Karbyshev by the sculptor Vladimir Tsigal stands at the Mauthausen concentration camp.

Personal life
He was married twice. He met his first wife Alisa Karlovna Troyanovich (1874-1913) of German descent, while serving in Vladivostok. After six years of married life Alisa died in 1913 and was buried in Brest at the Trishin's Cemetery.

While in Belarus, in 1916 Karbyshev married again a military nurse Lidiya Vasilyevna Opatskaya (1891–1976), who outlived her husband by 30 years. They had three children together - Yelena (1918-2006), Tatiana (1926—2003), and Aleksey (1929—1988).

Yelena followed in her father's footsteps and became a military engineer, having been awarded several orders and medals for her outstanding contributions. Tatiana worked as an economist, whereas Aleksey earned a Ph.D. in Economics and was a chairholder at the Moscow Financial Institute.

Legacy
A minor planet 1959 Karbyshev discovered in 1972 by Soviet astronomer Lyudmila Zhuravlyova is named after him.

The Soviet Union issued a commemorative postage stamp in his honor in 1961 and in 1980. There are also streets in numerous cities in the former Soviet Union named after Karbyshev.

In 2022, Karbyshev was featured in the Hearts of Iron 4 modification The New Order as the leader of the Black League, an ultranationalist society whose core values included the total destruction of Germany and its people, as well as those who were complacent with the destruction of Russia during World War 2.

Awards and honors
Soviet Union
 Hero of the Soviet Union
 Order of Lenin
 Order of the Red Banner
 Order of the Red Star
Russian Empire

 Order of St Vladimir, 4th degree (Russian Empire)
 Order of St. Anne 4th degree (Russian Empire)
 Order of St. Anne 3rd degree (Russian Empire)
 Order of St. Stanislaus 3rd degree with swords (Russian Empire)
 Order of St. Stanislaus 2nd degree (Russian Empire)

References

External links

 www.vor.ru

1880 births
1945 deaths
Military personnel from Omsk
People from Akmolinsk Oblast (Russian Empire)
Soviet lieutenant generals
Recipients of the Order of St. Anna, 3rd class
Recipients of the Order of St. Vladimir, 4th class
Recipients of the Order of Lenin
Recipients of the Order of the Red Banner
Heroes of the Soviet Union
Military Engineering-Technical University alumni
Russian military personnel of the Russo-Japanese War
Russian military personnel of World War I
Soviet military personnel killed in World War II
Soviet prisoners of war
Military personnel who died in Nazi concentration camps
People who died in Mauthausen concentration camp
Executed military leaders
Deaths from hypothermia
Soviet people who died in Nazi concentration camps